Appeal to tradition (also known as argumentum ad antiquitatem or argumentum ad antiquitam, appeal to antiquity, or appeal to common practice) is a claim in which a thesis is deemed correct on the basis of correlation with past or present tradition. The appeal takes the form of "this is right because we've always done it this way", and is considered by some to be a logical fallacy. The opposite of an appeal to tradition is an appeal to novelty, in which one claims that an idea is superior just because it is new.

An appeal to tradition essentially makes two assumptions that may not be necessarily true:

 The old way of thinking was proven correct when introduced, i.e. since the old way of thinking was prevalent, it was necessarily correct. 
In reality, this may be false—the tradition might be entirely based on incorrect grounds.
 The past justifications for the tradition are still valid. 
In reality, the circumstances may have changed; this assumption may also therefore have become untrue.

See also 

 Appeal to novelty
 Argument from authority
 Argument to moderation
 Common sense
 Conservatism
 Herd mentality
 Inductive reasoning
 List of logical fallacies
 Precedent
 Social inertia
 Status quo

Notes 

Tradition
Conservatism
Genetic fallacies
Fallacies
Tradition